The Great Wall of Saskatchewan is a project created by Albert Johnson. The wall is located approximately 1.6 km west of the Village of Smiley, Saskatchewan on Highway 772. Construction started in 1962 when Albert started arranging stones in the form of a wall. As stones were cleaned off the surrounding farmland Albert would add them to the wall. This continued clear until 1991. As the stones were transported to the wall they were placed so that the wall would support itself without the use of cement or mortar. The outer layer stones are specially shaped stones, that have been tapered inward in order to prevent the wall from moving. The interior of the wall is filled with small and odd shaped stones. During construction of the wall spruce trees were added alongside the wall for wind protection. After 29 years of work the wall was complete with a 6-foot base, stretching more than a 3/8 of a mile in length with an average height of 6 feet and 12 feet at places.

Along with the stone wall a sod house, built from sod cut out of the surrounding grasses was completed in 1986 with help from others in the Smiley area. In 1991, when the stone wall seemed to be complete, Albert began stoning the slopes around the wall and planting various flowers and vegetables.

See also
 Tourism in Saskatchewan

References

External links
Saskbiz Community Profiles: Prairiedale No. 321 - Great Wall of Saskatchewan

Tourist attractions in Saskatchewan
Fortifications in Canada
Buildings and structures in Saskatchewan
Oakdale No. 320, Saskatchewan
Division No. 13, Saskatchewan